The EMU700 is a series of electric multiple unit train used by the Taiwan Railways Administration. The TRA purchased 160 cars of the series. It was constructed by Nippon Sharyo and Taiwan Rolling Stock Company and began operations on 20 November 2007.

The EMU700 adopts current rules of Taiwan Railway Administration known as RAMS:
Reliability; Availability; Maintainability; System Safety. This train series operates as "Local Train" and "Local Express", using the pricing of NT$1.46 per km and person fare system identical to the Fuhsing Semi Express. Sometimes during the holidays it operates as "non-reserved " through train.

The EMU700 is nicknamed the "Suneo train" (阿福號) due to the resemblance of its front cab design with that of the character Suneo Honekawa from the Japanese manga and anime series Doraemon. A lunchbox counter designed in the style of the EMU700 front cab also exists at Platform 2 of Shulin Station in New Taipei City, Taiwan since July 2009.

Design
The EMU700 has distinctive hinged nose cone unlike its predecessors in the EMU line with smooth fronts.

On May 12, 2016, the livery of sets 701 and 702 was changed to the vermillion red with white stripe Keikyu livery similar to those found on the Keikyu 800 series trains.

Features
Its interior features informational LEDs, similar to the cars of the Taipei Metro. It has an onboard broadcasting system that is able to play a note sound upon arrival to a station and when the doors open and close. It also contains a lighting system, an emergency call device, and a cabin that are improved from its predecessors.

Derivative
The new EMU800 train sets were developed from the EMU700 to replace the ageing EMU400 trains and supplement the existing fleet of TRA's local class trains.

References

Electric multiple units of Taiwan
25 kV AC multiple units
Nippon Sharyo multiple units